The Pennsylvania–West Virginia League was a professional minor league baseball league that consisted of teams based in Pennsylvania and West Virginia. It played from 1908 to 1909 as a Class D level league and again in 1914 as an Independent league.

Teams
Charleroi, PA: Charleroi Cherios (1908); Charleroi (1909, 1914)
Clarksburg, WV: Clarksburg Drummers (1908); Clarksburg Bees (1909, 1914)
Connellsville, PA: Connellsville Cokers (1908–1909, 1914)
Fairmont, WV: Fairmont Badies (1908); Fairmont Champions (1909) Fairmont (1914)
Grafton, WV: Grafton Wanderers (1909) ;Grafton Wanderers (1908)
McKeesport, PA: McKeesport Royals (1914)
Parkersburg, WV: Parkersburg Parkers (1909)
Scottdale, PA: Scottdale Millers (1908)
Uniontown, PA: Uniontown Coal Barons (1908–1909): Uniontown (1914)

League champions
Clarksburg was the league champion in 1908
Uniontown was the league champion in 1909
The 1914 league champion were the Connellsville Cokers.

Standings & statistics

1908 to 1909
1908 Pennsylvania–West Virginia League
schedule
Scottdale (24–46) moved to Grafton July 21. Playoff: Clarksburg 3 games, Uniontown 1. 
 
1909 Pennsylvania–West Virginia League
Charleroi (13–25) moved to Parkersburg June 30, Parkersburg was dropped July 10, when Clarksburg disbanded. Playoff: Uniontown 4 games, Fairmont 3.

1914
1914 Pennsylvania–West Virginia League
schedule
 McKeesport and Charleroi disbanded May 26. The league collapsed June 1. President McKinnon resigned May 25 when the league declined to be affiliated with the independent major Federal League, after having been denied protection by the National Board.

References

Defunct minor baseball leagues in the United States
Baseball leagues in Pennsylvania
Baseball leagues in West Virginia
Sports leagues established in 1908
Sports leagues disestablished in 1914